Paolo Costa (born 23 July 1943) is the president of the Venice Port Authority. He was elected as an Italian member of the European Parliament in 1999 and 2004, and since 2003 he was the chair of the Committee on Transport and Tourism at the European Parliament. He was elected on the Olive Tree ticket and sat with the Alliance of Liberals and Democrats for Europe group.

Before entering politics he held numerous posts in planning and economics at Ca' Foscari University of Venice, University of Reading, U.K., and New York University. He served as pro-rector of Ca' Foscari University in Venice (1992–1996). He was a member of Venice City Council (1997–2000) and mayor of Venice (2000–2005). He was chairman  of the Council of AISRE (Italian Association of Regional Science) (1982–1984); member of the Scientific Committee for the Italian General Transport Plan (1985–1987), and Italian Minister for Public Works (1996–1998).
 
He received the honour of Knight of the Grand Cross, Order of Merit of the Italian Republic in 1998.

External links 
 
 Port of Venice site

1943 births
Living people
The Democrats (Italy) politicians
Democracy is Freedom – The Daisy politicians
Politicians of Veneto
Mayors of Venice
Democratic Party (Italy) MEPs
MEPs for Italy 2004–2009
MEPs for Italy 1999–2004